Andrew Richardson (born 4 November 1955) is an Australian judoka. He competed in the men's middleweight event at the 1984 Summer Olympics. In 1986, he won the bronze medal in the 86kg weight category at the judo demonstration sport event as part of the 1986 Commonwealth Games.

References

External links
 

1955 births
Living people
Australian male judoka
Olympic judoka of Australia
Judoka at the 1984 Summer Olympics
Place of birth missing (living people)